The following are the national records in athletics in Suriname maintained by its national athletics federation: Surinaamse Atletiek Bond (SAB).

Outdoor

Key to tables:

h = hand timing

A = affected by altitude

OT = oversized track (> 200m in circumference)

Men

Women

Junior Men

Junior Women

Indoor

Men

Women

Junior Men

Junior Women

References
General
Surinamese Outdoor records 30 March 2019 updated
World Athletics Statistic Handbook 2018: National Indoor Records
Specific

External links
 SAB official web site

Suriname
records
Athletics
Athletics